John J. McDonough (1895 – February 27, 1962) was an American lawyer and Democratic politician who served as Mayor of Saint Paul, Minnesota, from 1940 to 1948.

Life and career

McDonough was born in Saint Paul in 1895. He attended Saint Thomas Academy and the University of Minnesota before earning a law degree at the St. Paul College of Law in 1918. He worked as a lawyer and served in the Minnesota House of Representatives for five terms from 1925 to 1935. While he was nonpartisan, he was well known for fighting prohibition and held a mixture of conservative legal beliefs but liberal political ones. He was elected mayor of Saint Paul in 1940. While in office in 1946 he suffered a stroke which left him largely paralyzed (though mentally alert) for the remainder of his life. He died in St. Paul on February 27, 1962.

References

Mayors of Saint Paul, Minnesota
William Mitchell College of Law alumni
Minnesota lawyers
Democratic Party members of the Minnesota House of Representatives
Politicians from Saint Paul, Minnesota
1895 births
1962 deaths
20th-century American politicians
20th-century American lawyers